Rosemary Clare Duffield (born 1 July 1971) is a British Labour Party politician who has served as Member of Parliament (MP) for Canterbury since 2017.

Early life
Rosemary Clare Duffield was born on 1 July 1971 in Norwich, Norfolk, England. and later moved to South East London where her father worked as an anti-terrorism police officer. She left school at the age of 16 and completed an administration apprenticeship at Guy's Hospital. She then attended a further education college. She moved to Canterbury in 1998 and worked as a primary school teaching assistant in various schools, before becoming briefly a political satire writer.

In 2015, Duffield stood in the St Stephen's ward of Canterbury City Council where both seats were won by the Conservatives.

Parliamentary career

2017–2018 Parliament 
Duffield was elected to parliament in the 2017 general election with a majority of 187, defeating the incumbent Conservative Member of Parliament (MP) Julian Brazier. Brazier had been its MP since 1987 and the constituency had been represented by a Conservative since its creation in 1918.

On her election, she was appointed Parliamentary Private Secretary (PPS) to Dawn Butler, the Shadow Secretary of State for Women and Equalities. On 13 June 2018, Duffield was one of six MPs to resign from the Opposition frontbench to vote in favour of remaining in the single market by joining the European Economic Area, as the party had instructed its MPs to abstain. She has been a member of the Environment, Food and Rural Affairs Select Committee since March 2020 and was previously a member of the Work and Pensions Select Committee between June 2018 and November 2019 and the Women and Equalities Committee between September 2017 and June 2018 and March and May 2020.

Duffield is opposed to new grammar schools, and Eleven-plus exams. She was criticised for this stance after it emerged that both her children had gone to grammar schools.

Duffield voted for the UK remaining within the EU in the 2016 UK EU membership referendum. In the indicative votes on 27 March 2019, she voted for a customs union with the EU and a referendum on a Brexit withdrawal agreement, but abstained on the "Common Market 2.0" proposal.

In July 2017, she appeared on RT, a television network funded by the Russian government. Duffield later apologised to the LGBT+ community for her appearance.

In September 2018, Duffield attended a march protesting at Labour's stance on antisemitism and said that MPs could strike if the party did not endorse the International Holocaust Remembrance Alliance (IHRA)'s definition of antisemitism. She was criticised by some local party members for her attendance. In July 2019 the chair of her constituency Labour Party said her language was "incredibly reckless" after she agreed with a remark by the Chair of the Jewish Labour Movement that Labour "probably is" institutionally anti-Semitic.

2019–2023 Parliament 
In October 2019, Duffield succeeded Jess Phillips as Chair of the Women's Parliamentary Labour Party.

On 14 April 2020, Duffield was appointed a Labour whip by new Labour leader Keir Starmer. In May 2020, she resigned from the position after breaking COVID-19 lockdown rules when she met her married partner whilst they were living in separate households. Duffield apologised and said she accepted her actions constituted a breach of the guidance at the time.

In July 2020, Duffield voiced to parliament concerns about nitrous oxide being sold to and used recreationally by young people, calling for tighter restrictions on its sale. Duffield said that use of the drug had become "much more prevalent" during the 2020 coronavirus lockdown and cited health concerns over its use.

In August 2020, Duffield was criticised by several organisations, including Pride Canterbury and the equalities officers of the Canterbury Constituency Labour Party, for writing in a tweet that "only women have a cervix", with LGBT+ Labour calling on Labour leader Keir Starmer to "take action". Duffield locked her Twitter account after a fake tweet attributed to her was circulated. Labour MPs Jess Phillips, Rachel Reeves and Wes Streeting supported Duffield, as did the Archbishop of Canterbury Justin Welby, who tweeted that "she does not seek to demean others".

On 14 August 2020, a lesbian woman, reported to be her only LGBT staff member, quit Duffield's team, saying that her stance was transphobic and had brought an influx of transphobic and homophobic mail to the MP's office in support of the remarks. Duffield reasserted her commitment to reforming the Gender Recognition Act 2004 and to being a supporter of trans rights following the staff member's resignation. In October 2020, a second member of Duffield's staff resigned citing the "overtly transphobic views" of the MP. Duffield was criticised by the GMB trade union for attempting to dox her former staff member by "attempting to reveal her identity on social media".

On 27 July 2021, it was reported that the Labour Party would undertake an investigation into Duffield following complaints by LGBT+ Labour, after she liked a tweet by Kurtis Tripp, a gay American rapper, describing trans people as "mostly heterosexuals cosplaying as the opposite sex".

In September 2021, in an interview on BBC Radio 4, Duffield said that: "There are men, activists, out there who are married to women who call themselves the Q word [queer], and they appropriate gay culture in a way that is deeply offensive to quite a lot in the gay movement, the gay rights movement." Her comments were cited in an article on biphobia in Pink News which said: "Comments like these invalidate the identity of bi/pan/queer men in different-gender relationships." Talking to anti-transgender activist Graham Linehan in the same month, Duffield described non-binary gender as "choosing not to be male or female". She said that assigned female at birth non-binary people should be asked "Why are you rejecting mostly being female, being a woman?"

Also in September 2021, Duffield said she would miss the Labour Party conference in Brighton on security advice. According to The Sunday Times, she received online threats from transgender campaigners. Duffield discussed the abuse directed against her with House of Commons Speaker Sir Lindsay Hoyle, Labour's Chief Whip Sir Alan Campbell and her local police. Duffield told The Sunday Times that she mainly took the decision to miss the Party Conference "not because I really thought I was going to be attacked, but because I did not want to be the centre of attention." Duffield later made an unexpected appearance to speak at a non-official fringe event at the party's conference hosted by the Labour Women's Declaration group.

In October 2021, Duffield attended the first annual conference of the LGB Alliance – a group that has been described by the Labour Campaign for Trans Rights as "transphobic", where she spoke on a panel about free speech alongside fellow MP Joanna Cherry. In October 2022, The Daily Telegraph reported that, with fellow "gender critical" parliamentarians Joanna Cherry and Anne Jenkin, Baroness Jenkin of Kennington, she was setting up a cross-party "biology policy unit", "to help ensure policies across the public sector that are based on gender identity theory are documented and scrutinised".

Duffield said in a series of tweets in January 2022 that she was "considering her future in the Labour party very carefully" because of the "obsessive harassment" received by party members and a lack of support from the party leadership against the "constant stream of fictional and factional bile that is written about me".

In 2020 several Labour groups called for the whip to be withdrawn from Duffield, stating her views are transphobic. In October 2022, Labour Students, Young Labour and LGBT+ Labour urged the party to withdraw the whip from Duffield. Labour Students said that "Duffield's behaviour has gone beyond the pale and we echo LGBT+ Labour's calls that she should lose the whip" and that she has "consistently gone out of her way to damage the trans community, including appearing at the conference of an anti-trans lobbying group." In the same month Kent Labour Students issued a statement calling for her to lose the Labour whip and to be replaced as the Labour candidate at the next election.

On 20 January 2023, Duffield wrote a column in which she stated that being a member of the Labour Party is like being in an "abusive relationship" and that she feels the party has a "woman problem" after she was shouted down for voicing her concerns about the First Minister of Scotland Nicola Sturgeon's Gender Recognition Reform (Scotland) Bill.

Personal life
Duffield is in a relationship with television producer James Routh and has two sons from a past relationship. During a debate on the Domestic Abuse Bill on 2 October 2019, she said she suffered domestic abuse from her former partner in late 2017. Duffield's hobbies include satire writing and geocaching.

References

External links

 

1971 births
Living people
Female members of the Parliament of the United Kingdom for English constituencies
Labour Party (UK) MPs for English constituencies
Politics of Canterbury
UK MPs 2017–2019
UK MPs 2019–present
21st-century British women politicians
Politicians from Norwich
21st-century English women
21st-century English people